The N102 is a main transportation artery in Bangladesh, between Comilla and Brahmanbaria. It connects Chittagong Division to Sylhet Division. The highway is known along various stretches as the Comilla-Sylhet Highway.

The highway 
The highway, connecting the Comilla and Brahmanbaria districts of Chittagong Division, runs approximately 82 km (51 mi) from Sarail, an upazila in the Brahmanbaria district, to Mainamati, of Comilla.

The highway cuts through the Burichang, Brahmanpara upazila in Comilla district and Kasba, Brahmanbaria Sadar and Sarail upazila in Brahmanbaria district.

Brahmanbaria section 
At  in length, the Brahmanbaria section of the highway starts in Sarail biswa road crossing (Connecting with N2).

Comilla section 
At  in length, the Comilla section of the highway starts in Makimpur in Brahmanpara Upazila.

References

National Highways in Bangladesh